Hasanabad-e Abrizeh (also Romanized as Ḩasanābād-e Ābrīzeh; also known as Hasanābād, Ḩasanābād Porīzan, and Ḩoseynābād) is a village in Rezvaniyeh Rural District, in the Central District of Tiran and Karvan County, Isfahan Province, Iran. At the 2006 census, its population was 1,229, in 353 families.

References 

Populated places in Tiran and Karvan County